Fusivoluta lemaitrei is a species of sea snail, a marine gastropod mollusk in the family Volutidae.

References

Volutidae